Leptoceletes is a genus of net-winged beetles in the family Lycidae. There are about five described species in Leptoceletes.

Species
These five species belong to the genus Leptoceletes:
 Celetes pectinifer Kiesenwetter, 1874
 Celetes quadricollis Kiesenwetter, 1874
 Leptoceletes basalis (LeConte, 1847)
 Leptoceletes dehiscens (Green, 1952)
 Leptoceletes pallidus (Green, 1952)

References

Further reading

 
 
 

Lycidae
Articles created by Qbugbot